Christian Presciutti (born 27 November 1982) is an Italian water polo player. At the 2012 Summer Olympics, he competed for the Italy men's national water polo team in the men's event, where Italy won the silver medal.

See also
 List of Olympic medalists in water polo (men)
 List of world champions in men's water polo
 List of World Aquatics Championships medalists in water polo

References

External links
 
 
 
 

1982 births
Living people
Sportspeople from Venice
Italian male water polo players
Water polo drivers
Water polo players at the 2012 Summer Olympics
Water polo players at the 2016 Summer Olympics
Medalists at the 2012 Summer Olympics
Medalists at the 2016 Summer Olympics
Olympic silver medalists for Italy in water polo
Olympic bronze medalists for Italy in water polo
World Aquatics Championships medalists in water polo